Amos Kinne Hadley (October 12, 1812 – March 5, 1901) was an American lawyer and politician who served as a member and speaker of the New York State Assembly.

Early life and education
Hadley was born in Waterford, Vermont, the son of Stephen Hadley (1777–1861) and Sarah Cushman Hadley (1780–1867). He graduated from Hamilton College. Then he studied law with Judge John P. Cushman in Troy, New York, and was admitted to the bar in 1843.

Career 
Hadley served as a Whig member of the New York State Assembly in 1847 (Rensselaer Co.); 1848 and 1849 (both Rensselaer Co., 1st D.); and was Speaker in 1848 and 1849.

Death 
He died at the residence of his daughter in Mount Vernon, New York. He was buried at the Claverack Cemetery in Claverack, New York.

References

Sources
Courts and lawyers pages 1060-1073 at NY Court History
Hadley Genealogy
Hamilton College alumni reunion dinner in NYT, February 18, 1870
COLBY FAMILY & OTHERS at freepages.genealogy.rootsweb.com Genealogy at Rootsweb
Obit in NYT, on March 6, 1901 (erroneously giving first name as "Ernest", and age as "90" [he was 88])

1812 births
1901 deaths
New York (state) Whigs
19th-century American politicians
Speakers of the New York State Assembly
Members of the New York State Assembly
Politicians from Troy, New York
Hamilton College (New York) alumni
People from Caledonia County, Vermont